Caves Road may refer to:
 Caves Road (Maryland), a road in Baltimore County
 Caves Road (Western Australia), a road in the state's South West region